The Matsuoka Museum of Art is a private museum located in Shirokanedai, Minato, Tokyo, founded by Japanese developer Seijiro Matsuoka in November 1975.

The museum took advantage of the COVID-19 pandemic to close for renovations, reopening on 26 January, 2022 with an exhibition featuring many of the original pieces acquired by Matsuoka himself, and form the basis of the museum's collection.

Summary
The Museum initially opened in Shinbashi, but was moved to the site of Seijiro Matsuoka's private residence following his passing in April 2000.

Seijiro Matsuoka (1894–1989), was a real estate developer who initially made his fortune as a jewelry dealer in the 1920s, then expanded his fortune through real estate holdings in office buildings, frozen food storage, and hotels following World War 2. He was known as a collector of Chinese ceramics, Gandhara Indian sculptures, Impressionist paintings, sculptures, and antiquities.

Acquisition of a significant Ming era Jingdezhen porcelain bottle from Sotheby's in 1974 for the then record price of £420,000 (250 million yen in Japanese yen at the time) convinced Matsuoka of the need to establish a museum to share his collection with the public.

The collection includes contemporary sculptures by Bourdelle and Henry Moore, Gandhara stone sculptures and medieval Hindu sculptures, oriental ceramics from China, Korea, Japan and Vietnam, Japanese paintings from Muromachi ink paintings to Showa, Renoir, Modigliani, and modern French paintings such as Vlaminck.

Notable works
Western paintings
Claude Monet, Country Road in Normandy, 1868
Pierre-Auguste Renoir, Portrait of Lucien Daudet, pastel, 1879
Eugène Boudin, Pilot of the Sea, 1884
Armand Guillaumin, The Rocks of Agay, 1893
Hippolyte Petitjean, Landscape with Nymph, 1901
Camille Pissarro, Afternoon of the Carousel Bridge, 1904
Henry Moret, Whirlpools, Finistère, 1911
Amedeo Modigliani, Bust of a Young Woman (Lady Martha), circa 1916-7
Paul Signac, Port of Saint-Tropez, 1923
Georges Rouault, Inside Brittany, 1938
Maurice de Vlaminck, Sunset in the Forest, 1938
Albert Marquet, Port of Algiers, 1942
Paul Delvaux, Orpheus, 1956

Japanese paintings
Hokke Mandala Figure, late Heian
Takebayashi Kanaizu, paper book sumi-tansai with the appreciation of Takean Taien (Important Cultural Property)
Kano Sanraku, Oromatsu Furugi Flower and Bird Drawing Screen, Early Edo period
Maruyama Okyo, Yui Koi Waterfowl Figure Screening Screen, 1974
Ikeda Shoen and Terukata Co-operation Sakurabune and Autumn Leaves Hunting Screen, 1912
Hiroyo Terasaki Snowboard in the Sea of Spring in the Sea, 1914
Hidene Ikegami, Gangami Cormorant Folding Screen 1972

Location

15 minutes walk from JR Meguro Station East Exit. 6 minutes on foot from Tokyo Metro Shirokanedai Station

Notable exhibitions

 Matsuoka Museum of Art, "Tategura Nihon-cho", August 1987
 Matsuoka Museum of Art, "Toyo Ceramic Ceramics", November 1991
 Matsuoka Museum of Art, "Ancient Oriental Sculpture", January 1994
 Matsuoka Museum of Art, "Tatezo Modern Painting in France", 1995
 Matsuoka Museum of Art, "Ecole de Paris Exhibition from the French Impressionists in the Matsuoka Museum of Art", 1996
 Matsuoka Museum of Art, "Japanese painting selection", October 2006
 Matsuoka Museum of Art, "Walking with the Matsuoka Museum of Art", Norio Oyama, October 2009
 Matsuoka Museum of Art, "Reopening Memorial Exhibition: The essence of the Matsuoka Collection", 2022

References

External links
 Matsuoka Museum of Art - Official Website

1975 establishments in Japan
Art museums established in 1975
Art museums and galleries in Tokyo
Ceramics museums in Japan
Buildings and structures in Minato, Tokyo